Associazione Sportiva Roma was left trailing in the wake of city rivals Lazio's resurgence to fight for domestic and international glory. In coach Zdeněk Zeman's second season at the reins, Roma finished fifth in the table, and just missed out on qualification for the final Champions League spot. Roma reached the quarter-finals of the UEFA Cup, but lost to Atlético Madrid.

Zeman employed an attacking 4–3–3 formation. Forwards Marco Delvecchio, Francesco Totti and Paulo Sérgio scored 42 league goals between them. As a team, Roma scored the most goals in Serie A, but poor defensive play led to them conceding 49 goals, the most of any of the top six teams.

Players

Transfers

Competitions

Overall

Last updated: 23 May 1999

Serie A

League table

Results summary

Results by round

Matches

Coppa Italia

Second round

Round of 16

UEFA Cup

First round

Second round

Third round

Quarter-finals

Statistics

Players statistics

Goalscorers
  Marco Delvecchio 18
  Francesco Totti 12 (3)
  Paulo Sérgio 12
  Eusebio Di Francesco 8
  Carmine Gautieri 6

References

A.S. Roma seasons
Roma